The 2016 Nevada Senate election took place as part of the biennial United States elections. Nevada voters elected state senators in 11 of the state senate's 21 districts. State senators serve four-year terms in the Nevada Senate.

A primary election on June 14, 2016 determined which candidates appear on the November 8 general election ballot. Primary election results can be obtained from the State of Nevada's Secretary of State website.

On election day 2016, there were 11 Republicans and 10 Democrats in the Nevada Senate; in the 2014 state senate elections, they had gained a one-seat majority. In the 2016 election Democrats flipped it back, winning 11 seats.

Party registration advantage by district

Results

Summary of results by State Senate district
For districts not displayed, there is no election until 2018.

Source:

Detailed results by State Senate district

See also
United States elections, 2016
United States Senate election in Nevada, 2016
United States House of Representatives elections in Nevada, 2016
Nevada elections, 2016
Nevada State Assembly election, 2016

References

Nevada Senate elections
state senate
Nevada State Senate